Tajdeed-e-Wafa was a Pakistani drama produced by Momina Duraid under their banner MD Productions. It was directed by Ilyas Kashmiri, written by Samira Fazal, and starred Ainy Jaffry, Ahmed Ali, Naveen Waqar, and Haroon Shahid.

Cast 
Ainy Jaffri as Hareem Arsal.
Ahmed Ali Akbar as Arsal, Ashar's younger brother.
Naveen Waqar as Neha Ashar; Ashar's wife.
Haroon Shahid as Ashar, elder brother of Arsal
Shamil Khan as young (Abid Ali).
Tahira Imam as mother of Arsal and Ashar.
Laila Zuberi as Sheeba Jamal, Hareem's mother.
Nargis Rasheed as Arsal's Aunt, Warisha's Stepmother.
Areej Mohyudin as Warisha
Abid Ali as father of Arsal and Ashar.
Humayun Gul as Hareem's father.

Soundtrack 

The title song was sung by Amanat Ali & Dania Farooq. The music was composed by  Naveed Nashad and the lyrics were written by  Imran Raza.

References

External links

 Official Website

Pakistani drama television series
2018 Pakistani television series debuts
Urdu-language television shows
Hum TV original programming
Hum TV